United States gubernatorial elections were held on November 8, 2016, in 12 states and two territories. The last regular gubernatorial elections for nine of the 12 states took place in 2012. The last gubernatorial elections for New Hampshire, Oregon, and Vermont took place in 2014, as Oregon held a special election due to the resignation of Governor John Kitzhaber, while the governors of New Hampshire and Vermont both serve two-year terms. The 2016 gubernatorial elections took place concurrently with several other federal, state, and local elections, including the presidential election, Senate, and House elections.

The Republican Party won open Democrat-held governorships in Vermont, New Hampshire, and Missouri; and they also held their open seats in Indiana and North Dakota, increasing its total to 33. Democrats finished with 16 governorships, defeating incumbent Pat McCrory in North Carolina and holding open seats in Delaware and West Virginia, with one independent governor in Alaska accounting for the 50th gubernatorial seat. 

However, Governor Jim Justice of West Virginia switched his party affiliation to Republican shortly after his inauguration, thereby increasing the number of Republican governors to 34, tying their record set in the 1921 elections.

Election predictions 
Several sites and individuals publish predictions of competitive seats. These predictions look at factors such as the strength of the incumbent (if the incumbent is running for re-election), the strength of the candidates, and the partisan leanings of the state (reflected in part by the state's Cook Partisan Voting Index rating). The predictions assign ratings to each seat, with the rating indicating the predicted advantage that a party has in winning that seat. Most election predictors use "tossup" to indicate that neither party has an advantage, "lean" to indicate that one party has a slight advantage, "likely" or "favored" to indicate that one party has a significant but not insurmountable advantage, and "safe" or "solid" to indicate that one party has a near-certain chance of victory. Some predictions also include a "tilt" rating that indicates that one party has an advantage that is not quite as strong as the "lean" rating would indicate.

Race summary

States

Territories

Statistics

Closest races 
States where the margin of victory was under 1%:
 North Carolina, 0.22%

States where the margin of victory was between 1% and 5%:
 New Hampshire, 2.27%
 Puerto Rico, 2.93%
 Montana, 3.90%

States where the margin of victory was between 5% and 10%:
 Missouri, 5.57%
 Indiana, 5.96%
 West Virginia, 6.79%
 Oregon, 7.17%
 Vermont, 8.73%
 Washington, 8.76%

Red denotes states won by Republicans. Blue denotes states won by Democrats.
Dark Blue denotes race won by New Progressives

Partisan control of states 

All of the states that held gubernatorial elections in 2016 also held state legislative elections in 2016, although some legislative seats were not up for election in states that stagger legislative elections.

Delaware 

Two-term incumbent Governor Jack Markell was term-limited in 2016. Former Democratic Delaware Attorney General Beau Biden, the son of Vice President Joe Biden, announced his intention to run and was seen as the front-runner in the Democratic primary and general election, but he died of brain cancer at the age of 46 on May 30, 2015. Representative John Carney, a former Lieutenant Governor of Delaware who also ran for governor in 2008, won the Democratic nomination. State senator Colin Bonini won the Republican nomination.

Carney won the election, taking 58.3% of the vote compared to Bonini's 39.2%.

Indiana 

One-term incumbent Governor Mike Pence announced his bid for re-election. Pence won in 2012 with 49.6% of the vote. Pence previously served as a U.S. Representative from 2001 to 2013 and was Chairman of the House Republican Conference from 2009 to 2011. Pence had expressed interest in running for President of the United States in the 2016 presidential election, but declined. However, Pence withdrew his bid for a second term on July 15, 2016, to run for vice president as running mate to Donald Trump. Pence was replaced as the gubernatorial nominee by Lieutenant Governor Eric Holcomb.

The 2012 Democratic nominee, former State House Speaker John R. Gregg, won the Democratic nomination. State Representative Karen Tallian and Indiana Superintendent of Public Instruction Glenda Ritz both withdrew their candidacies. State Representative Terri Austin, South Bend Mayor Peter Buttigieg, former Lieutenant Governor Kathy Davis, Kokomo Mayor Greg Goodnight, Lafayette Mayor Tony Roswarski, and House Minority Leader Scott Pelath declined to run for governor. Potential Democratic candidates include former United States Attorney for the Southern District of Indiana and former Secretary of State of Indiana Joe Hogsett, President and CEO of the Biocrossroads Initiative and nominee for the U.S. Senate in 2000 David Johnson, Hammond Mayor Thomas McDermott, Jr., physician, former Commissioner for the Indiana State Department of Health and candidate for Indiana's 7th congressional district in 2008, Woody Myers, former State Senate Minority Leader and nominee for lieutenant governor in 2012 Vi Simpson, U.S. Representative Pete Visclosky and former Evansville Mayor Jonathan Weinzapfel. Former Governor and Senator Evan Bayh had considered running, but has since announced he is running for the U.S. Senate in 2016.

Holcomb won election with 51.4% of the vote, while Gregg took 45.4%.

Missouri 

Two-term incumbent Governor Jay Nixon was term-limited in 2016. U.S. Senator and 2004 gubernatorial nominee Claire McCaskill and State Treasurer Clint Zweifel declined to run for governor. On August 3, 2016, Missouri Attorney General Chris Koster won the nomination with a dominating 79% of the primary vote.

Former Speaker of the Missouri House of Representatives Catherine Hanaway, businessman John Brunner, State Senator Bob Dixon, former Navy SEAL Eric Greitens, and Lieutenant Governor Peter Kinder ran for the Republican nomination. State Representative Bart Korman and U.S. Representative Blaine Luetkemeyer declined to run for governor. Missouri State Auditor Tom Schweich had been a candidate for governor before he committed suicide in February 2015. On August 3, 2016, Greitens won the nomination with 35% of the vote.

Greitens won the election, taking 51.3% of the vote compared to Koster's 45.4%.

Montana 

One-term incumbent Governor Steve Bullock ran for re-election. Bullock was elected in 2012 with 48.9% of the vote. He previously served as Attorney General of Montana from 2009 to 2013.

Former Secretary of State Brad Johnson and businessman Mark Perea ran for the Republican nomination, but were defeated by businessman Greg Gianforte. Montana Attorney General Tim Fox had been speculated as a potential candidate, but instead chose to run for re-election.

Bullock won re-election, taking 50.2% of the vote. Gianforte won 46.4% of the vote.

New Hampshire 

Two-term Democratic incumbent Governor Maggie Hassan ran for the U.S. Senate, narrowly defeating incumbent Republican Kelly Ayotte, instead of running for a third term as governor. She won a second term in 2014 with 53% of the vote against Republican businessman Walt Havenstein. Executive Councilor Colin Van Ostern defeated Deputy Secretary of State and Director of Securities Regulation Mark Connolly for the Democratic nomination.

Executive Councilor Chris Sununu, state representative and entrepreneur Frank Edelblut, and Jon Lavoie ran for the Republican nomination. Sununu defeated his challengers for the Republican nomination.

Despite most pre-election polling suggesting a Democratic win, Sununu narrowly won election with 49% of the vote. Van Ostern won 46.7% and Libertarian Max Abramson won 4.3% of the vote.

North Carolina 

One-term incumbent Governor Pat McCrory ran for re-election. McCrory was elected in 2012 with 54.7% of the vote. McCrory previously served as Mayor of Charlotte from 1995 to 2009.

North Carolina Attorney General Roy Cooper defeated former State Representative Kenneth Spaulding to win the Democratic nomination for governor. James Protzman, a former Chapel Hill town council member, had declared his candidacy, but later withdrew from the race. United States Secretary of Transportation Anthony Foxx declined to run for governor.

After a dispute in results, Cooper won the election. Cooper won 49% of the vote, while McCrory won 48.9%.

North Dakota 

One-term incumbent Governor Jack Dalrymple declined to seek re-election. Dalrymple was elected to his first full term with 63.1% of the vote in 2012, after first taking the seat in 2010 after John Hoeven resigned to become a U.S. Senator. Dalrymple was previously Lieutenant Governor of North Dakota from 2000 to 2010.

Republican candidates included Attorney General Wayne Stenehjem, businessman Doug Burgum, and State Representative and plastic surgeon Rick Becker. Burgum won the nomination.

Potential Democratic candidates included former Congressman Earl Pomeroy, state Senator George B. Sinner and state Senate Minority Leader Mac Schneider. Former Agriculture Commissioner Sarah Vogel formed an exploratory a campaign but announced on Jan. 28, 2016 that she will not run for governor. Senator Heidi Heitkamp declined to run for governor. State representative Marvin Nelson won his party's nomination.

Burgum won the election, taking 76.7% of the vote, while Nelson won 19.4%.

Oregon (special) 

Governor John Kitzhaber, who won reelection in 2014 with 49.9% of the vote, announced his pending resignation on February 13, 2015, amid controversy surrounding his fiancée's consulting contracts and work within his administration. Kate Brown, Oregon's Secretary of State, was sworn in as governor on February 18, 2015, upon Kitzhaber's resignation. In accordance with the Constitution of Oregon, a special election was held in 2016 for the remainder of the term to which Kitzhaber was elected in 2014. Brown ran against Republican Bud Pierce, an Oncologist from Salem.

Brown won the election, taking 50.5% of the vote compared to Pierce's 43.8%. In winning, Kate Brown became the first openly LGBTQ Governor elected in the United States.

Utah 

Incumbent Governor Gary Herbert ran for re-election. He was the Lieutenant Governor of Utah from 2005 to 2009 and became governor after Jon Huntsman, Jr. resigned to become United States Ambassador to China. He won the seat in a 2010 special election and was elected to his first full term with 68.4% of the vote in 2012. Herbert defeated businessman Jonathan Johnson to win the nomination.

Businessman Michael Weinholtz won the Democratic nomination. Former Congressman Jim Matheson declined to run.

Herbert won re-election, taking 66.6% of the vote compared to Weinholtz's 28.9%.

Vermont 

Three-term incumbent Governor Peter Shumlin declined to seek re-election. He was re-elected with 46.4% of the vote in 2014. As he did not receive a majority of the vote, the Vermont General Assembly was required to choose the winner. The Vermont Assembly chose Shumlin over Republican nominee Scott Milne by 110 votes to 69.

Sue Minter defeated former state senator Matt Dunne for the Democratic nomination for governor. House Speaker Shap Smith withdrew from the race. Former lieutenant governor Doug Racine declined to run for governor.

Lieutenant Governor Phil Scott won the Republican nomination. Former state senator and former Vermont Auditor of Accounts Randy Brock and 2014 Republican nominee Scott Milne declined to run for governor. Former Libertarian gubernatorial candidate Dan Feliciano was a potential candidate.

Scott won the election, taking 52.9% compared to Minter's 44.2%.

Washington 

One-term incumbent Governor Jay Inslee ran for re-election. Inslee was elected in 2012 with 51.4% of the vote against Republican Attorney General Rob McKenna. Inslee previously served as a U.S. Representative from 1993 to 1995 and from 1999 to 2012. Seattle Port Commissioner Bill Bryant advanced to the November general election. Potential Republican candidates include U.S. Representatives Jaime Herrera Beutler and Cathy McMorris Rodgers, State Senator Michael Baumgartner, and former State Representative Cathy Dahlquist.

Inslee won re-election, taking 54.2% of the vote. Bryant won 45.5%.

West Virginia 

Governor Earl Ray Tomblin was term-limited in 2016. Tomblin was first elected in a 2011 special election after Joe Manchin resigned after being elected to the United States Senate. Tomblin then won election to a full term in 2012.

Democratic candidates included former U.S. Attorney Booth Goodwin, state Senator Jeff Kessler, and businessman Jim Justice. Former Senator Carte Goodwin, former Speaker of the West Virginia House of Delegates Rick Thompson, West Virginia State Treasurer John Perdue, State Senator Mike Green and State Delegates Doug Reynolds, Doug Skaff and West Virginia Secretary of State Natalie Tennant declined to seek the nomination.  On May 10, 2016, Justice won the Democratic primary and became the nominee.

President of the Senate Bill Cole, college student and former candidate for Mayor of Pineville Andrew Utterback, and former Bramwell Police Chief and former Democratic candidate for House of Delegates Edwin Vanover ran for the Republican nomination. U.S. Representatives David McKinley and Evan Jenkins declined to run for governor. West Virginia Attorney General Patrick Morrisey had been considered a potential Republican candidate, but instead chose to run for re-election. Potential Republican candidates included State Delegate Erikka Storch and Olympic gymnast Mary Lou Retton. Cole won the Republican nomination.

Justice won the election, taking 49.1% of the vote. Cole won 42.3%, while Charlotte Pritt of the Mountain Party won 5.9% of the vote. Just months after assuming office, Justice switched to the Republican Party.

Territories

Puerto Rico 

One-term incumbent Governor Alejandro García Padilla was eligible to run for re-election, but chose to retire. García Padilla is a member of the Popular Democratic Party (PDP).

David Bernier, former Secretary of State of Puerto Rico and former President of the Puerto Rico Olympic Committee, won the PDP nomination for governor.

Resident Commissioner of Puerto Rico Pedro Pierluisi, who is affiliated with the New Progressive Party (PNP). and activist and political commentator Ricky Rosselló sought the PNP nomination for governor, and Rosselló won the nomination.

Rosselló won the election.

American Samoa 

One-term incumbent Governor Lolo Letalu Matalasi Moliga ran for re-election. Moliga was elected in 2012 with 52.9% of the vote in the second round, after taking 33.5% of the vote in the first round. American Samoa requires a second round of voting if no candidate takes a majority of the vote in the first round.

Moliga won re-election.

See also 
 2016 United States elections
 2016 United States presidential election
 2016 United States Senate elections
 2016 United States House of Representatives elections

Notes

References 

 
November 2016 events in the United States